Yugo-Zapadny (masculine), Yugo-Zapadnaya (feminine), or Yugo-Zapadnoye (neuter), meaning "South-West" in Slavic languages, may refer to:
South-Western Administrative Okrug (Yugo-Zapadny administrativny okrug), an administrative okrug of Moscow, Russia
Yugo-Zapadnaya, a station of the Moscow Metro, Russia
Yugo-Zapadnaya, a station of the Saint Petersburg Metro, Russia

See also
Southwest (disambiguation)
Yugo-Zapad Municipal Okrug, a municipal okrug of Saint Petersburg, Russia